Quantum chemistry computer programs are used in computational chemistry to implement the methods of quantum chemistry. Most include the Hartree–Fock (HF) and some post-Hartree–Fock methods. They may also include density functional theory (DFT), molecular mechanics or semi-empirical quantum chemistry methods. The programs include both open source and commercial software. Most of them are large, often containing several separate programs, and have been developed over many years.

Overview 

The following tables illustrates some of the main capabilities of notable packages:

Numerical details

Quantum chemistry and solid-state physics characteristics

Post processing packages in quantum chemistry and solid-state physics

See also

Footnotes
† "Academic": academic (no cost) license possible upon request; "Commercial": commercially distributed.

‡ Support for periodic systems (3d-crystals, 2d-slabs, 1d-rods and isolated molecules): 3d-periodic codes always allow simulating systems with lower dimensionality within a supercell. Specified here is the ability for simulating within lower periodicity.

2 QuanPol is a full spectrum and seamless (HF, MCSCF, GVB, MP2, DFT, TDDFT, CHARMM, AMBER, OPLSAA) QM/MM package integrated in GAMESS-US. 

10 Through CRYSCOR  program.

References

Further reading 
 
 
 

Density functional theory software
Computational chemistry software
Molecular modelling software
Physics software
Lists of software